Martin Bosma (born 16 July 1964) is a Dutch politician and former journalist serving as a member of the House of Representatives for the Party for Freedom (PVV) since 30 November 2006 and as Deputy Speaker of the House of Representatives since 2017. He focuses on matters of higher education, mass media and culture.

Biography

Early years
Born in Wormer, Bosma studied political science with a specialisation in public administration at the University of Amsterdam and sociology at the New School of Social Research in New York City.

He worked many years for several news media, first as a reporter for one of his local papers, De Zaanlander, and as one of the principal anchor men for Hoeksteen Live, a monthly cable TV programme in the 1990s described as a "political programme with a cultural supplement", and subsequently for outlets including CNN Business News, ABC's Nightline and NOS Journaal. From 2002 to 2004 he was director of Nederlandse Radiogroep and from 2004 to 2006 he was active as a political consultant for the PVV's predecessor Groep Wilders.

Political career
Bosma was elected to the House of Representatives in the 2006 general election. He was reelected in 2010, 2012 and 2017. He became a member of the Presidium of the House of Representatives, serving as the Second Deputy Speaker. As such, when Gerdi Verbeet resigned as Speaker on 20 September 2012, Bosma served as Acting Speaker of the House of Representatives until 25 September 2012. He attempted to become Speaker in the 2016 election, but he came fourth, obtaining sixteen votes in the first round of voting. He retained his position of Second Deputy Speaker.

Bibliography 
 De schijn-élite van de valse munters (Prometheus, 2010). 
 Minderheid in eigen land (Bibliotheca Africana Formicae, 2015).

References

External links 

 House of Representatives biography
 Party for Freedom biography

1964 births
Living people
20th-century Dutch journalists
21st-century Dutch journalists
21st-century Dutch male writers
21st-century Dutch non-fiction writers
21st-century Dutch politicians
Dutch campaign managers
Dutch political consultants
Dutch political journalists
Dutch speechwriters
Dutch language activists
Members of the House of Representatives (Netherlands)
Party for Freedom politicians
People from Wormerland
The New School alumni
University of Amsterdam alumni